Fernbridge is a  concrete arch bridge designed by American engineer John B. Leonard which opened in 1911 at the site of an earlier ferry crossing of the Eel River. Fernbridge is the last crossing before the Eel arrives at the Pacific Ocean, and anchors one end of California State Route 211 leading to Ferndale, California. When built, it was named the "Queen of Bridges" and is still the longest functional poured concrete bridge in operation in the world.

Construction
After 17 years of petitioning by residents of Ferndale and the Eel River valley, Humboldt County Supervisors accepted bids for construction in 1910, and work started March 20 of that year. Reinforced concrete was used because studies after the 1906 San Francisco earthquake along  of the San Andreas Fault from Ferndale south to San Jose, California showed that reinforced concrete withstood earthquakes. The nearly  span cost  to build, and consumed millions of board feet of local redwood timber for the framing. Construction was finished and the bridge put into operation on November 8, 1911. The original wooden approaches were replaced with the current concrete ramps in 1920.

Floods
The bridge survived floods in 1912, 1913, 1914, 1915, 1937, 1953, 1955, 1964 and 1986. The south side abutment was washed out, and the approach damaged.

Nine years later during the Christmas flood of 1964, every stream gauge on the Eel River was either inundated and useless or destroyed except the one at Fernbridge and nearly every bridge on the Eel River was badly damaged because the force of the water was aided by thousands of redwood logs stacked for winter mill production along the bank of the river as well as homes and barns swept away by the rapidly rising waters. A large island which had built itself upstream of the bridge was washed away in the wake of the 1964 floods.

Historic designation

On September 24, 1976, the American Society of Civil Engineers designated Fernbridge as an historic civil engineering landmark and installed a plaque on the northwest approach pylon to the bridge.

In 1987, the California Department of Transportation (Caltrans) recommended studying the removal of Fernbridge and replacement with a more modern span, such as the many which have washed into the Eel River during floods which Fernbridge withstood. The Eel River regularly floods Fernbridge to the tops of the lower ridge of the support.  In some high flood years, photographs have been taken showing the water level over the upper cone-shaped tops of the support pillars as well as valley-wide flooding in 1915.  Residents of Ferndale campaigned to stop any changes to the historic bridge and Fernbridge was added to the National Register of Historic Places on April 2, 1987.

Recent events
In 1995, Fernbridge served as the set for scenes in the movie Outbreak, where a string of U.S. Army tanks rolls across the bridge accompanied by low-flying assault helicopters. In 2008, Caltrans initiated restoration of the railings of Fernbridge to their original appearance. Additional small improvements were made in 2008 and 2009, but Fernbridge's general appearance remains unchanged.

For the 100th anniversary celebration on August 7, 2011, a ceremony was held, the bridge was officially closed to cross vehicular traffic, a run over and back was held as was done on opening day in 1911, a parade of historic vehicles and local dignitaries crossed over, and a Ferndale resident borrowed construction lights and lit it at night. The Ferndale Museum produced a video related to the bridge and continues to exhibit information about its history.

The United States Geological Survey maintains a live webcam at Fernbridge near their stream gauge to visually monitor stream conditions.

On December 20, 2022, an earthquake damaged the bridge, and the California Highway Patrol temporarily closed it to all traffic. The bridge was fully repaired by March 2023 at a cost of over $12 million.

References

Bridges in Humboldt County, California
Eel River (California)
Concrete bridges in California
Deck arch bridges in the United States
Bridges completed in 1911
Road bridges on the National Register of Historic Places in California
National Register of Historic Places in Humboldt County, California
1911 establishments in California